The Victoria Falls Classic was a golf tournament on the South African Tour from 1976 to 1979. The event was held in October or November at the Elephant Hills Country Club at Victoria Falls, Rhodesia.

The inaugural event was sponsored by Meikles. Nick Job beat Andries Oosthuizen in a sudden-death playoff after they had tied on 293.

Days after the 1977 event, the Elephant Hills Country Club was destroyed by fire, after being hit by a missile during the Rhodesian Bush War.

Winners 
1976  Nick Job
1977  John Bland
1978  Simon Hobday
1979  Phil Simmons

References 

Former Sunshine Tour events
Golf tournaments in Zimbabwe
Sport in Rhodesia